Sofia Olofsson (born 4 September 1989) is a  Swedish female professional kickboxer, Muay Thai fighter. On 25 November 2016, at the Rumble of the Kings 15: Awakening, in Stockholm, Sweden, she defeated Parita Nongprai Padpho on TKO for the World Muaythai Council bantam weight world title. On 25 November 2017, at the Rumble of the Kings 18: Uprising, in Gothenburg, Sweden, she successfully defended her world title against Iman Barlow.

Olofsson won the gold medal at The World Games in 2017 in the under 54kg category.
She has also won gold medals at the 2015 IFMA Royal World Cup and the 2016 and 2018 IFMA World Championships. In 2016 she won the International World Games Association - Athlete of the Year award, by public poll, having received a staggering 39% of the total number of votes.

Championships and accomplishments

Championships
Professional
World Muaythai Council
WMC World Bantamweight (-53.5 kg) Championship
One successful title defense
WMC European Bantamweight (-53.5 kg) Championship
Amateur
IMFA
2013 IFMA European Championship  (-54 kg)
2014 IFMA World Championship  (-54 kg)
2014 IFMA European Championship  (-54 kg)
2015 IFMA Royal World Cup  (-54 kg)
2016 IFMA World Championship  (-54 kg)
2017 IFMA European Championship  (-54 kg)
2018 IFMA World Championship  (-54 kg)
International World Games Association - The World Games
2017 The World Games Muay Thai Championship  (-54 kg)
Regional championships
2012 Swedish National Muay Thai Chamopionship  (-54 kg)
2013 Nordic Muay Thai Championship  (-54 kg)
2013 Swedish National Muay Thai Championship  (-54 kg)
2014 Swedish National Muay Thai Championship  (-54 kg)
2015 Swedish National Muay Thai Championship  (-54 kg)
2016 Swedish National Muay Thai Championship  (-54 kg)
2016 Nordic Muay Thai Championship  (-54 kg)
2017 Swedish National Muay Thai Championship  (-54 kg)
2018 Swedish National Muay Thai Championship  (-54 kg)

Awards
2015 IMFA Royal Cup - Best Female Fighter
2016 International World Games Association - Athlete of the Year
2016 IMFA World Championship - Best Female Fighter
2017 The World Games - Best Female Fighter
2017 Awakening Fighters Female Muay Thai Awards - Fight of the Year vs. Iman Barlow on 25 November

Kickboxing and Muay Thai record

|-  style="background:#fbb;"
| 2019-06-22 || Loss ||align=left| Anissa Meksen || Glory 66: Paris || Paris, France || TKO (doctor stoppage) || 1 || 2:06 || 
|-
! style=background:white colspan=9 |
|-  style="background:#cfc;"
| 2019-05-17 || Win||align=left| Christi Brereton || Glory 65: Utrecht  || Utrecht, Netherlands || Decision (split) || 3 ||  3:00 ||
|-
|-  style="background:#cfc;"
| 2018-10-20 || Win||align=left| Cindy Silvestre || Glory 60: Lyon  || Lyon, France || Decision (unanimous) || 3 ||  3:00 ||
|-
|-  style="background:#fbb;"
| 2018-07-20 || Loss ||align=left| Tiffany van Soest || Glory 55: New York || New York City, New York, United States || Decision (split) || 3 || 3:00 || 
|-
|-  style="background:#cfc;"
| 2017-11-25 || Win ||align=left| Iman Barlow || Rumble of the Kings 18: Uprising || Gothenburg, Sweden || Decision (unanimous) || 5 || 3:00 || 
|-
! style=background:white colspan=9 |
|-  style="background:#cfc;"
| 2017-04-09 || Win ||align=left| Zhang Jiao || World Muay Thai Angels Tournament 2 || Bangkok, Thailand || TKO (knees) || 3 ||  || 
|-
|-  style="background:#cfc;"
| 2016-11-25 || Win ||align=left| Parita Nongprai Padpho || Rumble of the Kings 15: Awakening || Stockholm, Sweden || TKO (retirement) || 2 ||  || 
|-
! style=background:white colspan=9 |
|-  style="background:#cfc;"
| 2016-09-03 || Win ||align=left| Meryem Uslu || West Coast Battle 8 || Varberg, Sweden || TKO || 4 ||  || 
|-
! style=background:white colspan=9 |
|-  style="background:#fbb;"
| 2015-07-11 || Loss ||align=left| Fatima Pinto || Supremacy League 5 || Visby, Sweden || Decision (unanimous) || 3 || 3:00 || 
|-
! style=background:white colspan=9 |
|-  style="background:#cfc;"
| 2015-03-27 || Win ||align=left| Dalia Ali || Rumble in Väsby || Upplands Väsby, Sweden || Decision (unanimous) || 3 || 3:00 || 
|-
|-  style="background:#fbb;"
| 2014-06-07 || Loss ||align=left| Fatima Pinto || World Fighters United || Stockholm, Sweden || Decision (split) || 3 || 3:00 || 
|-
! style=background:white colspan=9 |
|-  style="background:#cfc;"
| 2013-11-02 || Win ||align=left| Therese Gunnarsson || West Coast Battle 5 || Varberg, Sweden || Decision (unanimous) || 3 || 3:00 || 
|-
|-  style="background:#cfc;"
| 2013-04-06 || Win ||align=left| Marjo Rautanen || Chitalada Showdown 4 || Tampere, Finland || Decision (unanimous) || 3 || 3:00 || 
|-
|-  style="background:#cfc;"
| 2012-10-27 || Win ||align=left| Judith Levi || West Coast Battle 4 || Varberg, Sweden || TKO || 4 || || 
|-
|-  style="background:#fbb;"
| 2012-00-00 || Loss ||align=left| Milja Heino || Chitalada Showdown 3 || Tampere, Finland || Decision (unanimous) || 5 || 2:00 || 
|-
|-  style="background:#cfc;"
| 2011-10-29 || Win ||align=left| Linda Tjernström || West Coast Battle 3 || Varberg, Sweden || Decision (unanimous) ||  || || 
|-
|-  style="background:#cfc;"
| 2011-09-00 || Win ||align=left| Cecilia Eriksson || Templet Muay Thai || Stockholm, Sweden || TKO || 4 || || 
|-
|-  style="background:#cfc;"
| 2011-05-00 || Win ||align=left| Jenny Krigsman || Time to fight 2 || Mariestad, Sweden || Decision (unanimous) ||  || || 
|-

|-
|-  style="background:#cfc;"
| 2018-05-19 || Win ||align=left| Yadrung Tehirang || I.F.M.A. World Championship Tournament 2018, Final - 54 kg || Cancun, Mexico || Decision (unanimous) || 3 || 3:00 ||
|-
! style=background:white colspan=9 |
|-  style="background:#cfc;"
| 2018-05-18 || Win ||align=left| Maria Lobo || I.F.M.A. World Championship Tournament 2018, Semi-Final - 54 kg || Cancun, Mexico || Decision (unanimous) || 3 || 3:00 ||
|-  style="background:#cfc;"
| 2018-05-15 || Win ||align=left| Ana Mendoza || I.F.M.A. World Championship Tournament 2018, Quarter-Final - 54 kg || Cancun, Mexico || Decision (unanimous) || 3 || 3:00 ||
|-  style="background:#cfc;"
| 2018-02-24 || Win ||align=left| Anna Höglund || Swedish Championship Tournament 2018, Final - 54 kg || Stockholm, Sweden || TKO || 2 ||  ||
|-
! style=background:white colspan=9 |
|-  style="background:#cfc;"
| 2017-10-21 || Win ||align=left| Juliette Lacroix || I.F.M.A. European Championship Tournament 2017, Final - 54 kg || Paris, France || TKO (knees to the body) || 3 ||  ||
|-
! style=background:white colspan=9 |
|-  style="background:#cfc;"
| 2017-10-19 || Win ||align=left| Maryia Zhuk || I.F.M.A. European Championship Tournament 2017, Semi-Final - 54 kg || Paris, France || TKO (punches) || 1 || 1:20 ||
|-
|-  style="background:#cfc;"
| 2017-10-17 || Win ||align=left| Valeriya Drozdova || I.F.M.A. European Championship Tournament 2017, Quarter-Final - 54 kg || Paris, France || Decision (unanimous) || 3 || 3:00 ||
|-
|-  style="background:#cfc;"
| 2017-07-30 || Win ||align=left| Valeriya Drozdova || The World Games 2017, Final - 54 kg || Wrocław, Poland || Decision (unanimous) || 3 || 3:00 ||
|-
! style=background:white colspan=9 |
|-  style="background:#cfc;"
| 2017-07-29 || Win ||align=left| Tristana Tola || The World Games 2017, Semi-Final - 54 kg || Wrocław, Poland || TKO (punches) || 3 ||  ||
|-
|-  style="background:#cfc;"
| 2017-07-28 || Win ||align=left| Maria Lobo || The World Games 2017, Quarter-Final - 54 kg || Wrocław, Poland || Decision (unanimous) || 3 || 3:00 ||
|-
|-  style="background:#cfc;"
| 2017-02-25 || Win ||align=left| Anna Höglund || Swedish Championship Tournament 2017, Final - 54 kg || Stockholm, Sweden || TKO || 1 ||  ||
|-
! style=background:white colspan=9 |
|-  style="background:#cfc;"
| 2016-05-27 || Win ||align=left| Natalia Dyachkova || I.F.M.A. World Championship Tournament 2016, Final - 54 kg || Jönköping, Sweden || Decision (unanimous) || 3 || 3:00 ||
|-
! style=background:white colspan=9 |
|-  style="background:#cfc;"
| 2016-05-26 || Win ||align=left| Jlhan Baurukkali || I.F.M.A. World Championship Tournament 2016, Semi-Final - 54 kg || Jönköping, Sweden || TKO (knee) || 2 || 1:30 ||
|-
|-  style="background:#cfc;"
| 2016-05-24 || Win ||align=left| Tristana Tola || I.F.M.A. World Championship Tournament 2016, Quarter-Final - 54 kg || Jönköping, Sweden || Decision (unanimous) || 3 || 3:00 ||
|-
|-  style="background:#cfc;"
| 2016-05-21 || Win ||align=left| Melissa Reaume || I.F.M.A. World Championship Tournament 2016, First Round - 54 kg || Jönköping, Sweden || TKO (body kick) || 3 ||  ||
|-
|-  style="background:#cfc;"
| 2016-02-13 || Win ||align=left| Claudia Sendlak || Swedish Championship Tournament 2016, Final - 54 kg || Varberg, Sweden || Decision (unanimous) || 3 || 3:00 ||
|-
! style=background:white colspan=9 |
|-  style="background:#cfc;"
| 2016-02-11 || Win ||align=left| Linda Åhlström || Swedish Championship Tournament 2016, Semi-Final - 54 kg || Varberg, Sweden || TKO || 1 ||  ||
|-
|-  style="background:#cfc;"
| 2016-11-12 || Win ||align=left| Anne Line Hogstad || Nordic Championship Tournament 2016, Final - 54 kg || Uleåborg, Finland || TKO (punches) || 3 ||  ||
|-
! style=background:white colspan=9 |
|-  style="background:#cfc;"
| 2015-08-16 || Win ||align=left| Andra Aho || I.F.M.A. Royal World Cup Tournament 2015, Final - 54 kg || Bangkok, Thailand || TKO (punches) || 3 ||  ||
|-
! style=background:white colspan=9 |
|-  style="background:#cfc;"
| 2015-08-16 || Win ||align=left| Namtarn Por. Muangphet || I.F.M.A. Royal World Cup Tournament 2015, Semi-Final - 54 kg || Bangkok, Thailand || Decision (unanimous) || 3 || 3:00 ||
|-
|-  style="background:#cfc;"
| 2015-08-16 || Win ||align=left| Sveva Melillo || I.F.M.A. Royal World Cup Tournament 2015, Quarter-Final - 54 kg || Bangkok, Thailand || Decision (unanimous) || 3 || 3:00 ||
|-
|-  style="background:#cfc;"
| 2015-08-14 || Win ||align=left| Alena Mishehuk || I.F.M.A. Royal World Cup Tournament 2015, First Round - 54 kg || Bangkok, Thailand || KO (punches) || 1 ||  ||
|-
|-  style="background:#cfc;"
| 2015-01-25 || Win ||align=left| Michelle Rubin || Swedish Championship Tournament 2015, Final - 54 kg || Örebro, Sweden || TKO (punches) || 2 ||  ||
|-
! style=background:white colspan=9 |
|-  style="background:#cfc;"
| 2014-09-28 || Win ||align=left| Burcu Karakis || I.F.M.A. European Championship Tournament 2014, Final - 54 kg || Krakow, Poland || TKO (knees) || 2 ||  ||
|-
! style=background:white colspan=9 |
|-  style="background:#cfc;"
| 2014-09-27 || Win ||align=left| Siiri Tura || I.F.M.A. European Championship Tournament 2014, Semi-Final - 54 kg || Krakow, Poland || TKO (right high kick) || 3 ||  ||
|-
|-  style="background:#cfc;"
| 2014-09-26 || Win ||align=left| Natalia Dyachkova || I.F.M.A. European Championship Tournament 2014, Quarter-Final - 54 kg || Krakow, Poland || KO (knees) || 3 ||  ||
|-
|-  style="background:#fbb;"
| 2014-05-06 || Loss ||align=left| Ovescena Kizhnerova || I.F.M.A. World Championship Tournament 2014, Semi-Final - 54 kg || Langkawi, Malaysia || Decision (unanimous) || 3 || 3:00 ||
|-
! style=background:white colspan=9 |
|-  style="background:#cfc;"
| 2014-05-05 || Win ||align=left| Marina Zueva || I.F.M.A. World Championship Tournament 2014, Quarter-Final - 54 kg || Langkawi, Malaysia || Decision (unanimous) || 3 || 3:00 ||
|-
|-  style="background:#cfc;"
| 2014-05-04 || Win ||align=left| Yi Sin Tang || I.F.M.A. World Championship Tournament 2014, First Round - 54 kg || Langkawi, Malaysia || KO || 3 ||  ||
|-
|-  style="background:#cfc;"
| 2014-01-18 || Win ||align=left| Jessica Isaksson Lukashina || Swedish Championship 2014, Final - 54 kg || Umeå, Sweden || TKO || 3 ||  ||
|-
! style=background:white colspan=9 |
|-  style="background:#cfc;"
| 2013-08-25 || Win ||align=left| Fatima Khattoti || Nordic Championship 2013, Final - 54 kg || Helsinki, Finland || TKO  || 2 || 
|- 
! style=background:white colspan=9 |
|-  style="background:#cfc;"
| 2013-08-24 || Win ||align=left|  || Nordic Championship 2013, Semi-Final - 54 kg || Helsinki, Finland || TKO || 1 || 
|- 
|-  style="background:#fbb;"
| 2013-07-27 || Loss ||align=left| Natalia Dyachkova || I.F.M.A. European Championship Tournament 2013, Final - 54 kg || Lisbon, Portugal || Decision (unanimous)  || 3 || 3:00 ||
|- 
! style=background:white colspan=9 |
|-  style="background:#cfc;"
| 2013-07-25 || Win ||align=left| Siiri Tura || I.F.M.A. European Championship Tournament 2013, Semi-Final - 54 kg || Lisbon, Portugal || Decision (unanimous)  || 3 || 3:00 ||
|-  
|-  style="background:#cfc;"
| 2013-07-24 || Win ||align=left| Meltem Bas || I.F.M.A. European Championship Tournament 2013, Quarter-Final - 54 kg || Lisbon, Portugal || Decision (split)  || 3 || 3:00 ||
|-    
|-  style="background:#cfc;"
| 2013-01-25|| Win ||align=left| Jenny Krigsman || Swedish Championship 2013, Final -54 kg || Falun, Sweden || Decision (unanimous) || 3 || 3:00 ||
|- 
! style=background:white colspan=9 |
|-  style="background:#cfc;"
| 2012-12-22|| Win ||align=left| Evelina Wikner || Swedish Championship 2013, Semi-Final -54 kg || Falun, Sweden || Decision (unanimous) || 3 || 3:00 ||
|- 
|-  style="background:#fbb;"
| 2012-09-06|| Loss ||align=left| Ekaterina Vandaryeva || I.F.M.A. World Championship Tournament 2012, First Round -54 kg || St. Petersburg, Russia || Decision (unanimous) || 3 || 3:00
|- 
|-  style="background:#fbb;"
| 2012-01-28|| Loss ||align=left| Jessica Isaksson Lukashina || Swedish Championship 2012, Final -54 kg || Östersund, Sweden || Decision (unanimous) || 3 || 3:00
|- 
! style=background:white colspan=9 |
|-  style="background:#cfc;"
| 2012-01-14|| Win ||align=left| Linn Wennergren || Swedish Championship 2012, Semi-Final -54 kg || Halmstad, Sweden || Decision (split) || 3 || 3:00
|- 
|-  style="background:#cfc;"
| 2011-03-05|| Win ||align=left| Adela Persdotter ||  || Sweden || TKO (punches) || 1 ||   ||
|-               
|-
| colspan=9 | Legend:

References

External links
 Sofia Olofsson at Awakening Fighters

1989 births
Swedish female kickboxers
Swedish Muay Thai practitioners
Female Muay Thai practitioners
Swedish women boxers
Bantamweight kickboxers
People from Täby Municipality
Living people
Glory kickboxers
Competitors at the 2017 World Games
World Games gold medalists
Sportspeople from Stockholm County